Clément Cogitore (born 1983 in Colmar, France) is a French contemporary artist and filmmaker.  Combining film, video, installations and photographs, Cogitore questions the modalities of cohabitation between humankind and its own images and representations.

Early life and studies 
Clément Cogitore grew up in Lapoutroie, in eastern France (Upper Rhine). Studying in Strasbourg at the Academy of Applied Arts and then at Le Fresnoy - Studio national des arts contemporains (French National Studio of Contemporary Art), Clément Cogitore developed his artistic practice at the crossroads of contemporary art and cinema.

Career 
Since 2011, Cogitore’s work has been screened and exhibited at the Palais de Tokyo, MADRE (Naples), Centre Georges Pompidou (Paris), Institute of Contemporary Arts (London), Haus der Kulturen der Welt (Berlin), MACRO (Rome), Museum of Fine Arts (Boston), MoMA (New-York), MNBA (Québec), SeMA Bunker (Seoul), Kunsthaus Baselland] (Basel), Red Brick Art Museum (Beijing), Rockbund Museum (Pékin), Hirschhorn Museum and Sculpture Garden (Washington), MUDAM (Luxembourg) notably.

In 2010, his short movie Parmi nous (Among us) was awarded the Grand Prize of the European First Film Award (Vevey). That same year his documentary movie Bielutine was selected for Cannes' Directors' Fortnight. In 2011 Cogitore was awarded the Grand Prize of Salon de Montrouge for contemporary art and the following year he became resident of the Villa Medici, French Academy in Rome.

In 2015, his first feature film The Wakhan Front was selected at the Cannes international film festival – Critic’s week, awarded by the Gan Foundation. That same year he won the BAL Prize for contemporary art. In 2016, he won the SciencesPo Prize for contemporary art and the 18th Ricard Foundation Prize for contemporary art. In 2017, Cogitore released his documentary movie Braguino (Telluride, San Sebastian, Marseille, Toronto, Buenos Aires, Moscow festivals).

In 2018, Clément Cogitore was awarded the Marcel Duchamp Prize for Contemporary Art, for his work The Evil Eye. Since 2018, he is teaching at the Ecole des Beaux Arts de Paris, where he is in charge of one studio.

To celebrate its 350th anniversary, in 2019, the Opéra National de Paris has entrusted Clément Cogitore with staging the entirety of Jean-Philippe Rameau’s opera ballet, Les Indes galantes. Les Indes Galantes was selected by The New York Times as one of the best opera productions of 2019, nominated best opera production 2019 by the Giornale della Musica and won the Forum Opera Trophy of the Best new opera production 2019.

Cogitore’s work is represented in several public collections (Centre Georges Pompidou, National Fund for Contemporary Art, Contemporary Art Fund of the City of Paris, FRAC Alsace, FRAC Aquitaine, FRAC Auvergne, MAC VAL, Museum of Modern and Contemporary Art of Strasbourg) and private collections (Louis Vuitton Collection, Daimler Art Collection).

Clément Cogitore is represented by Chantal Crousel Consulting, Paris.

Filmography

Installations 

 2018 : The Evil Eye
 2017 : Braguino or the impossible community

Videos 

 2017 : Lascaux
 2017 : Les Indes galantes (The amorous Indies)
 2016 : The resonant interval 
 2013 : Elegies
 2012 : Assange Dancing
 2012 : Tahrir
2011: An Archipelago
2007 : Visités
2006: Chroniques
2005 : Travel(ing)

Films 
 2022 : Goutte d'Or
 2017 : Braguino
 2015 : The Wakhan Front
2011 : Bielutin
2011 : Parmi nous (Among us)

Opera 

 Les Indes Galantes (The Amorous Indies), 2019, Opéra National de Paris (Bastille), France

The rehearsals and preparatory work for the opera have been the subject of a documentary film by Philippe Béziat, Les Indes Galantes (2021).

Solo shows 

 2019 : Clément Cogitore (Part I et II) – Kunsthaus Baselland, Basel, Switzerland. Curator : Inès Goldbach
 2019 : Clément Cogitore – Submarine Base Bordeaux, France. Curator : Anne-Sophie Dinant
 2019 : Clément Cogitore – Musée National Marc Chagall, Nice, France. Curators : Anne Dopffer and Gaïdig Lemarié
 2018 : Assange Dancing – Ikon Gallery, Birmingham, United Kingdom. Curator : Jonathan Watkins
 2018 : Les Indes Galantes – Tabakalera, International Centre for Contemporary Culture – San Sebastian, Spain. Curator : Víctor Iriarte
 2017 : Braguino or the impossible community – LE BAL, Paris, France. Curators : Léa Bismuth and Diane Dufour
 2017 : Parmi nous (Among us), new hanging within the framework of the Fondation d'Entreprise Ricard Award,  Musée National d'Art Moderne, Centre Georges Pompidou, Paris. Curator : Christine Macel
 2016 : The resonant interval, Palais de Tokyo, Paris. Curator : Daria de Beauvais

Group shows 

 2020 : Crossing Views, in dialog with Cindy Sherman – Fondation Louis Vuitton, Paris, France. Curator : Suzanne Pagé
 2020 : Me Family – MUDAM, Luxembourg. Curators : Francesco Bonami, Emmanuela Mazzonis, Clément Minighetti
 2020 : DO IT project (It’s Urgent) – LUMA (Arles, France), Serpentine Galleries (London, UK) and Théâtre du Châtelet (Paris, France). Curator : Hans-Ulrich Obrist 
 2020 : 20 years Prix Marchel Duchamp – Centre Georges Pompidou, Musée National d’Art Moderne, Paris, France. Curators : Christine Macel, Alicia Knock, Yung Ma
 2020 : Upheaval – Kunsthalle Mannheim, Mannheim, Germany. Curator : Johan Holten
 2020 : On the origins of images – Hirshhorn Museum and Sculpture Garden, Washington D.C., United States
2019 : An Opera for Animals – Rockbund Art Museum, Shanghai, China. Curator : Hsieh Feng-Rong
2019 : Bienalsur, Ways of Seeing – National Museum of Decorative Arts Buenos Aires, Argentina. Curator : Diana Wechsler
2019 : Macro_asilo – MACRO, Rome, Italy. Curators : Giorgio de Finis and Maria-Laura Cavaliere
2019 : On danse ? – MUCEM, Marseille, France. Curator : Emilie Girard
2018 : Prix Marcel Duchamp 2018 – Centre Georges Pompidou, Musée National d’Art Moderne – Paris, France. Curator : Marcella Lista
2018 : Evoking Reality – Daimler Contemporary, Berlin, Allemagne. Curators : Renate Wiehager and Nadine Isabelle Henrich
2018 : Persona Grata – MAC-VAL, Musée d’Art Contemporain du Val-de-Marne, Vitry sur Seine. Curator : Ingrid Jurzak
2018 : Respire : art videos from Lemaitre collection – Herzliya Museum of Contemporary Art, Tel Aviv, Israel. Curator : Marie Shek
2018 : Braguino, In formation III – ICA, Institute of Contemporary Arts, Londres, Royaume-Uni. Curator : Nico Marzano
2018 : Art of the real – Lincoln Center, New York, USA. Curator : Dennis Limm
2017 : The art of joy – Québec Biennale – Musée National des Beaux-Arts du Québec, Montréal, Canada. Curator : Alexia Fabre
2017 : Vision on vision, the Lemaitre video collection – SeMA Bunker, Seoul, South Korea. Curator : Hyunjin Kim
2016 : New directors, new films – MoMA, Museum Of Modern Art, New York, USA. Curator : Josh Siegel
2012 : Teatro delle esposizione – Villa Medici, Rome, Italy. Curator : Alessandro Rabottini
2011 : International encounters Paris/Berlin/Madrid – Centre Georges Pompidou, Musée National d’Art Moderne, Paris / Haus der Kulturen der Welt, Berlin / Museo Reina Sofia, Madrid, Spain. Curators : Jean-François Rettig and Nathalie Hénon

Publications 

 2017 : Braguino, DVD, Monography – Blaq out distribution, texts : Eugène Green and Laurent Mauvignier.
 2017 : Braguino or the impossible community – Monography – Co- Edition Filigranes // LE BAL, texts : Léa Bismuth and Bertrand Schefer.
 2016 : The Wakhan Front  – DVD, Monography – Kazak production.
 2016 : Hypothesis – DVD, Monography – Ecart production, texts : Philippe-Alain Michaud. 
 2014 : Atelier – Monography – Edition Les Presses du Réel, texts : Dominique Païni, Jean Michel Frodon et Anaël Pigeat.

Awards 

 2022 
Goute d'Or  – Selection Semaine de la Critique – Festival de Cannes, France 

 2020
Les Indes Galantes (Opera) – Best opera production  – Oper ! Awards - Berlin, Germany

 2019

Braguino - Nominated César Best Short Film – César Academy – France

Les Indes Galantes – 10 Best opera productions – New York Times – USA

Les Indes Galantes – Best opera production – Giornale della Musica Award – Italy

Les Indes Galantes – Best opera production – Forum Opéra Award – France
 2018
The Evil Eye – Marcel Duchamp Prize 2018 – France

Les Indes Galantes – Grand Prix UniFrance for short film – Cannes Film Festival – France

Braguino – Special Mention – BAFICI, Buenos Aires Festival Internacional de Cine Independiente – Argentina

Braguino – Special Mention, documentary competition – DokerFest – Moscow – Russia 
 2017
Braguino – Grand Prix (special mention) – FID Festival International de Cinéma – Marseille – France

Neither Heaven nor Earth  – Grand Prix – Kino der Kunst Film Festival – Artists under 35 – Munich – Germany

Braguino – Grand Prix – Les Ecrans Documentaires – La Rochelle – France

Braguino – Zabaltegi-Tabakalera Award – San Sebastian Film Festival – Spain

Braguino – Special mention from the Jury – Festival Internacional de Cine de Valdivia – Chile

 2016

18th Award of the Fondation d’entreprise Ricard – Paris – France

Sciences Po Award for Contemporary Art – Paris – France

Neither Heaven nor Earth – Award Best First Film – Colcoa Film Festival Los Angeles – USA

Neither Heaven nor Earth  – Jury Award – Sarasota International Film Festival – USA

Neither Heaven nor Earth – Prix Henri Langlois – France

 2015

LE BAL Award for Young creation – Paris – France

Neither Heaven nor Earth – Grand Prix Gan Foundation – Cannes Film Festival – Critic's Week – France

Neither Heaven nor Earth – Award Best First Film - Syndicat de la Critique – France

Neither Heaven nor Earth – Nominated for César Best First Film – France

Neither Heaven nor Earth – Nominated for Golden Camera – Cannes Film Festival – France

Neither Heaven nor Earth – Award Best First Film – Obrero International Film Festival – Sweden

Neither Heaven nor Earth – Award Best First Film - Motovun International Film Festival - Croatia

Neither Heaven nor Earth – Award Best Film – Festival International du Film d’Aubagne – France

Neither Heaven nor Earth – Prix Découverte – Festival du Film Francophone de Namur – Belgique

 2014

Award Fondation Nationale des Arts Graphiques et Plastiques (FNAGP) – Paris – France

 2012

Neither Heaven nor Earth – Award for the script – Fondation Beaumarchais – SACD – France

Parmi nous (Among us) – Best camera – Lucania International Film Festival – Italy 
 2011
Grand Prix Salon de Montrouge – 56th Salon de Montrouge – France

Biélutine – Official selection – Quinzaine des réalisateurs – Cannes Film Festival – France

Parmi nous (Among us) – Best Film – International Film Festival Belo Horizonte – Brasil

 2010

Parmi nous (Among us) – European Grand Prix First Film – Fondation Vevey – Switzerland

Biélutine – FIDLab Award – Festival International de Cinéma – Marseille – France

Burning cities – Experimental film award – FESANCOR, Chilean International Short Film Festival – Santiago – Chile

 2007

Visités – Jury award – Festival du Film de Vendôme – France

Visités – Best camera – International Student Film Festival – Belgrad – Serbia

 2006

Chroniques – Grand Prix (Special mention) – Festival Entrevues – Belfort – France

Chroniques – Best short film script – Fondation Beaumarchais – SACD – Paris – France

Chroniques – Award Center for cinematographic writing – Festival les Ecrans documentaires – Arcueil – France

References 

1983 births
Living people
French contemporary artists